ArX is a distributed version control system. ArX began as a fork of GNU arch, and is licensed under the GPL. Since the fork, ArX has been extensively rewritten in C++, with many new features. The project maintainer is Walter Landry.

History 
Landry was, for a short time, the maintainer of Arch, and forked ArX when Tom Lord resumed maintainership of Arch and did not accept some of Landry's development directions. The fork was announced in January 2003 and the first code was released in February. For a time ArX shared a mailing list and community with Arch, but Landry founded a new mailing list in August 2003 and the pre-release series became the 1.0 release series in December. The 2.0 series, which was incompatible with Arch, became public in October 2004.

References 

Free version control software
Free software programmed in C++
Distributed version control systems
Discontinued version control systems
Software that was rewritten in C++